Bédy-Goazon is a town in western Ivory Coast. It is a sub-prefecture of Guiglo Department in Cavally Region, Montagnes District.

Bédy-Goazon was a commune until March 2012, when it became one of 1126 communes nationwide that were abolished.

In 2014, the population of the sub-prefecture of Bédy-Goazon was 16,872.

Villages
The 3 villages of the sub-prefecture of Bédy-Goazon and their population in 2014 are:
 Bédy-Goazon (9 625)	
 Douédy-Guézon (5 252)	
 Zébly (1 995)

References

Sub-prefectures of Cavally Region
Former communes of Ivory Coast